Start Point is a promontory in the South Hams district in Devon, England, . Close to the most southerly point in the county, it marks the southern limit of Start Bay, which extends northwards to the estuary of the River Dart.

The rocks of the point are greenschist and mica-schist, formed by metamorphism of Devonian sediments during a period of mountain building towards the end of the Carboniferous period.

The name "Start" derives from an Anglo-Saxon word steort, meaning a tail. This root also appears in the names of birds with distinctive tails, like the redstart.

Features 

As a result of the many shipwrecks in the area, Start Point lighthouse was built in 1836 to alert ships to the danger of the point and its surrounding rocks. The lighthouse and the area's birdlife make it a popular spot for visitors, and Start Point is accessible to walkers from the South West Coast Path.

The Start Point transmitting station is located on top of the promontory, just north-west of the lighthouse. Built in 1939, it nowadays transmits only a single broadcast, BBC Radio 5 Live.

See also 
 Prawle Point
 Prawle Point and Start Point Site of Special Scientific Interest

Headlands of Devon
Geology of Devon
Stokenham